Route 417 ("Kvish Arba'-Achat-Sheva'") is an intercity road in Israel and the West Bank that stretches from the west side of Jerusalem to Ma'ale Adumim and Highway 1 east to the Jordan Valley.

History
Most of the road serves as a local thoroughfare within Jerusalem and East Jerusalem. The road has been non-contiguous since the construction of the Israeli West Bank barrier through Abu Dis in 2006. Route 417 used to be the main route from the west to the Jordan Valley and the Dead Sea, bypassing downtown Jerusalem. With the opening of Jerusalem Road 9 (Derech Yitzhak Shamir and Yigal Yadin Boulevard) and the Ma'ale Adumim Road, the historic route lost that distinction. With the closure of the road in Abu Dis, the route no longer serves that option at all.

Route
The route's name changes many times along the way. From west to east:

Yirmiyahu Street
Named after the biblical prophet, the route begins at Weizmann Boulevard at the base of the Strings Bridge, an area known historically as the western "Jerusalem Gate", the main entrance to the city from the west. It passes the beginning of Jaffa Road near the Jerusalem Central Bus Station and the headquarters of Magen David Adom. It then winds through the Romema neighborhood as a commercial and light-industrial four-lane divided boulevard.

Bar-Ilan Street

Just past the Shikun Chabad neighborhood, the well-known Bar-Ilan St. named after Rabbi Meir Berlin, passes between the Haredi neighborhoods of Tel Arza, Mahanayim and Bukharim. Here the road serves as a major shopping street. In many sections, fencing exists on the median divider to prevent pedestrians from crossing between controlled intersections on this heavily congested section. Before 1955, this was called "The Ring Road", skirting around the northern edge of what was then the built-up area of central Jerusalem.

Hativat HarEl Street
Named after the famous Harel Brigade, this 0.3 km section widens into a 6-lane divided boulevard between the Sanhedria and Shmuel HaNavi neighborhoods.

Levi Eshkol Boulevard
This section, built in 1968, was named after Israel's third prime minister. The route continues past the Ma'alot Dafna, Ramat Eshkol and Givat HaMivtar neighborhoods. Just short of Haim Bar-Lev Boulevard (Highway 60), also known as Jerusalem Road 1, a 0.2 km tunnel provides an alternate route bypassing the congested traffic-light controlled intersection which includes a crossing of the Jerusalem Light Rail tracks.

Hebrew University Boulevard
This 0.6 km stretch passes Kiryat Menachem Begin, the Dan Jerusalem Hotel (formerly the Hyatt Regency) and the main entrance road to the Hebrew University's Har HaTsofim campus.

Wadi al-Joz Street
While most traffic continues straight through the new Har HaTzofim tunnels bypassing East Jerusalem's built-up areas and connecting to Highway 1 to Ma'ale Adumim and the Dead Sea, the official Route 417 makes a right turn southward onto Wadi al-Joz St. Here, in the Wadi al-Joz neighborhood, named after the "Walnut Valley", the street serves as a main commercial artery. This section of the road contains many auto-repair shops giving it the nickname among Hebrew speakers of 'Wadi Egzōz' (i.e., exhaust).

al-Maqdesi Street
Continuing southward as a commercial street, this 0.4 km stretch, named after the famous 10th-century Arab geographer, passes the Failey Center for the Arts and the Rockefeller Museum as it approaches the northeast corner of Jerusalem's Old City.

Jericho Road
Along the eastern edge of the Old City, the now named Jericho Road descends into the Kidron Valley, also known by its biblical name, the Valley of Josaphat. The valley is the site of many tombs: the Tomb of the Blessed Virgin Mary, the Pillar of Absalom, the Tomb of Benei Hezir, the Tomb of Zechariah, the tomb of Josaphat and the tomb of Saint James.

The road then runs along the bottom of the Mount of Olives and continues through the Ras al-Amud, Ma'ale ha-Zeitim and Wadi Qadum neighborhoods as a commercial street.

At ash-Shiyah Street at the edge of Abu Dis, the Israeli West Bank barrier has been erected. Originally including a security checkpoint, the road was permanently closed in 2006. Past the barrier, the road continues as a commercial artery through Abu Dis, al-Eizariya and Jahalin.

As it passes Ma'ale Adumim, the route becomes a freeway, finally merging into Highway 1 to the Jordan Valley.

Junctions (west to east)

See also
List of highways in Israel

References

417
417
417